Özel is a Turkish name and may refer to:

Given name
 Özel Türkbaş (1938–2012), Turkish actress, model, singer and belly dancer

Surname
 Alena Özel-Hurkova (born 1984), Belarusian female volleyball player
 Feryal Özel (born 1975), Turkish-American astrophysicist 
 İsmet Özel (born 1944), Turkish poet
 Necdet Özel (born 1950), Turkish general
 Özge Özel (born 1991), Turkish women's footballer
 Özgür Özel (born 1974), Turkish politician
 Yeliz Özel (born 1980), Turkish female handball player

See also
 Özel Çag Lisesi schools, international schools located in Turkey
 TEV İnanç Türkeş Özel Lisesi
 Özel Jandarma Komando Bölüğü, the special forces unit of the Turkish Jandarma

Ozel